Octav is a Romanian male given name that may refer to:

Octav Băncilă (1872–1944), Romanian realist painter
Octav Botez (1884–1943), Romanian literary critic and historian
Octav Botnar (1913–1998), businessman
Octav Cozmâncă (born 1947), Romanian politician
Octav Dessila (1895–1976), Romanian novelist and playwright
Octav Mayer (1895–1966), Romanian mathematician
Octav Onicescu (1892–1983), Romanian mathematician
Octav Sargețiu (1908–1994), Romanian poet

See also 
Octav (film), a 2017 Romanian drama film

Romanian masculine given names